Floyd of the Jungle is a 1982 platform game for the Atari 8-bit family and part of the initial batch of games from  MicroProse. Designed and programmed by company co-founder Sid Meier, it is one of the few 2D action games he created and the only platform game. It allows up to four players at once.

The 1982 release is written in Atari BASIC. A second version, published in 1983, is programmed in assembly language for improved performance, and the computer controls any unused players. Version 2 was available for both the Atari 8-bit family and Commodore 64.

Gameplay

The player can make Floyd run left and right with the joystick, jump by pressing the joystick button, and punch by keeping the button held after landing from a jump. Some actions give points: collecting a bird (1 point), punching a pygmy (2 points), and reaching "Janice" at the top of the screen (4 points). In a multiplayer game, the first player to reach a predetermined point value wins. Single-player games have a time limit instead. Other hazards can hurt Floyd, sending him to the bottom of the screen.

Development
When asked in 1983 where the Floyd of the Jungle concept came from, Meier responded:

Reception
Computer Gaming World wrote:

In a 1984 review of the game's second release, Creative Computing concluded: "If you are really into the Donkey Kong type of games, and want every variation for your library, then you will want Floyd of the Jungle. But we think that there are others on the market that offer better playability and more fun." Antic liked the animation and 4 player capability, but found the penalty for running into obstacles to be harsh for new players.

Reviewing the C64 version for Electronic Games, Ted Salamone wrote, "it  doesn't have any great moments. It doesn't even have any good ones!" He called out the visuals as "so substandard that they are an insult, display an incredible lack of detail and imagination," and also that "poorly executed collision detection routines result in many an untimely death."

References

1982 video games
Atari 8-bit family games
Commodore 64 games
Platform games
Sid Meier games
Video games developed in the United States